Great House, Llanover, Monmouthshire is a country house dating from the late-16th century. Extended in the mid-18th century and little altered thereafter, it is a Grade II* listed building.

History
Cadw records the original house as being built in the late Elizabethan era, . The architectural historian John Newman attributes the mid-18th century rebuilding to the Lucas family, either the father Robert, who was "buying land aggressively in the 1730s", or his son, Richard. Cadw, following Sir Joseph Bradney, the Monmouthshire antiquarian, concludes that the son, High Sheriff of Monmouthshire in the 1760s, was the more likely builder. The Royal Commission on the Ancient and Historical Monuments of Wales Coflein database records the evidence of contemporary formal gardens. Further reconstruction took place in the Victorian era although Cadw acknowledges that it is hard to establish what was done. By the mid-20th century, the house was derelict, with a lengthy reconstruction beginning in the 1980s.

Architecture and description
Constructed of local rubble, the whole house was extended and rendered in the 18th century rebuilding. The main block, now of two storeys with attics, was originally fully three storeys in height. The "galumphing" porch and roof are Victorian additions. The interiors contain "rich decorative fittings" from the 17th, 18th and 19th centuries. The footprint of the original 16th century house is now difficult to determine, although Newman concludes it must have been "of considerable size (and) baffling plan". The house has a Grade II* listing.

Notes

References

Sources
 

Buildings and structures in Monmouthshire
Grade II* listed buildings in Monmouthshire